The 1969 Campeonato Brasileiro Série A (officially the 1969 Torneio Roberto Gomes Pedrosa) was the 13th edition of the Campeonato Brasileiro Série A. It began on 6 September and ended on 7 December. Santos came as the defending champion having won the 1968 season and Palmeiras won the championship, the 4th national title of the club at 10 years of tournament contention.

Championship format

First-phase: the 17 participants play all against all twice, but divided into two groups (one 8 and one 9) for classification, in the Group A, each team plays two more matches against any other. The first 2 of each group are classified for the finals.
Final-phase: the four clubs classified play all against all in a single round. The club with most points at this stage is the champion.
Tie-breaking criteria:
1 – Goal difference2 – Raffle

With one victory, a team still gained 2 points, instead of 3.

First phase

Group A

Group B

Final phase

Matches:

References
 1969 Campeonato Brasileiro Série A at RSSSF

 

Torneio Roberto Gomes Pedrosa
1969 in Brazilian football
Bra
B